Christina Bauer (born January 1, 1988) is a French volleyball player. She represented the France national team at the 2007 Women’s European Volleyball Championship. She was born in Bergen, Norway during a Christmas holiday to a French father, Jean-Luc Bauer, a professional volleyball player, and a Norwegian mother, Tone Bauer, a handball player who played several years in France. She also has a younger sister who played professionally for Le Cannet Volleyball Anne-Sophie Bauer. She speaks French, Norwegian, English and is learning Italian after being called to play for Yamamay Busto Arsizio. She currently plays for Italian professional volleyball team Nordmeccanica Piacenza.

Clubs

Awards

Club
 2011–12 CEV Cup -  Champion, with Yamamay Busto Arsizio
 2012–13 CEV Champions League -  Bronze medal, with Yamamay Busto Arsizio
 2013-14 CEV Cup -  Champion, with Fenerbahçe Istanbul
 2014-15 Turkish Cup -  Champion, with Fenerbahçe Grundig Istanbul
 2014–15 Turkish Women's Volleyball League -  Champion, with Fenerbahçe Grundig Istanbul

References

1988 births
Living people
French women's volleyball players
French people of Norwegian descent
French expatriate sportspeople in Turkey
Sportspeople from Bergen
Fenerbahçe volleyballers